Robert Banner may refer to:
Robert Bruce Banner, birth name of Hulk
Bob Banner (1921–2011), American producer, writer and director
Robert Banner (socialist) (1855–1910), Scottish socialist politician and trade unionist